Maciej Dąbrowski (born 20 April 1987) is a Polish professional footballer who plays as a centre-back for ŁKS Łódź.

Career

Club
In July 2011, he joined Olimpia Grudziądz.

International
Dąbrowski participated in the 2007 FIFA U-20 World Cup.

Career statistics

Club

1 All appearances in Polish SuperCup.

Honours

Club
Legia Warsaw
Ekstraklasa: 2016–17, 2017–18
Polish Cup: 2017–18

References

External links
 
 

Living people
1987 births
Polish footballers
Poland youth international footballers
Zawisza Bydgoszcz players
GKS Bełchatów players
Olimpia Grudziądz players
Pogoń Szczecin players
Zagłębie Lubin players
Legia Warsaw players
ŁKS Łódź players
Ekstraklasa players
I liga players
II liga players
People from Radziejów County
Sportspeople from Kuyavian-Pomeranian Voivodeship
Association football defenders